Sergio Cortopassi (born 7 May 1946 in San Miniato) is an Italian politician.

He was a member of the Italian Socialist Party and was elected Mayor of Pisa on 16 July 1990. He resigned and left his office on 1 September 1994.

See also
1990 Italian local elections
List of mayors of Pisa

References

External links
 

1946 births
Living people
Mayors of Pisa
Italian Socialist Party politicians